Orleans is an extinct town in Polk County, in the U.S. state of Missouri.

A post office called Orleans was established in 1846, and remained in operation until 1895. The community's name is a transfer from New Orleans.

References

Ghost towns in Missouri
Former populated places in Polk County, Missouri